Aryeh Leo Olitzki (4 June 1898 – 1983) was an Israeli bacteriologist.

Biography
Aryeh Olitzki was born in 1898 in Allenstein, East Prussia, Germany (now Olsztyn, Poland). He studied medicine at the universities of Berlin and Breslau, and was appointed assistant at the Institute of Hygiene of the University of Breslau, from where he obtained his doctorate.

In 1924, he immigrated to Mandate Palestine.

Olitzki headed the bacteriology laboratories at the Hadassah Hospital, Jerusalem and in Safed. In 1928, he joined the faculty of the Hebrew University of Jerusalem, and became a professor in 1949, and dean of the Medical School from 1961 to 1965.

Awards and recognition
 In 1967, Olitzki was awarded the Israel Prize, in medicine.
 Olitzki Street in Beersheba is named after him.

Published works
 Yesodot Torat ha-Ḥaidakkim ve-ha-Ḥasinut (A. L. Olitzki and N. Grossowicz), a textbook on microbiology and immunology in two volumes (1964–68)

See also
 List of Israel Prize recipients

References

External links
 Olitzki, Aryeh Leo (a biography) Jewish Virtual Library
 Antigenic Structures Of Haemophilus Aegyptius and Haemophilus Influenzae Demonstrated by the Gel Precipitation Technique, by Aryeh Leo Olitzki and Ada Sulitzeanu Journal of Bacteriology website

1898 births
1983 deaths
People from Olsztyn
19th-century German Jews
German emigrants to Mandatory Palestine
Humboldt University of Berlin alumni
University of Breslau alumni
Academic staff of the University of Breslau
Academic staff of the Hebrew University of Jerusalem
Israeli bacteriologists
Israel Prize in medicine recipients
People from East Prussia